Hillsboro City Schools, also known as Hillsboro City School District, is a school district that serves the town of Hillsboro, Ohio, United States.

Schools
The district operates five schools (in alphabetical order):
Hillsboro Early Childhood Center, Grades PK-1
Hillsboro High School, Grades 9-12
Hillsboro Intermediate School, Grades 4-5
Hillsboro Middle School, Grades 6-8
Hillsboro Primary School, Grades 2-3

References

External links

School districts in Ohio
Education in Highland County, Ohio
Schools